The black emo skink (Emoia nigra) is a species of lizard in the family Scincidae. It is found from the Solomon Islands, Vanuatu, eastward through Fiji to Tonga and western Samoa, Toga, Lo, Tegua, and Hiu Island.

References

Emoia
Reptiles described in 1853
Taxa named by Honoré Jacquinot
Taxa named by Alphonse Guichenot